The Jewish Peace Fellowship is a nonprofit, nondenominational organization set up to provide a Jewish voice in the peace movement.  The organization was founded in 1941 in order to support Jewish conscientious objectors who sought exemption from combatant military service.  The JPF is currently headquartered in Nyack, New York.

The fellowship is a branch member of the International Fellowship of Reconciliation.

The JPF produces literature about peacemaking, nonviolent activism, and registering as a conscientious objector.
The Jewish Peace Fellowship maintains its archive at the American Jewish Historical Society/Center for Jewish History in NYC

Further reading
Polner, Murray and Naomi Goodman (1994) The Challenge of Shalom: The Jewish Tradition of Peace and Justice. New Society Pub. 
 Jewish Peace Fellowship (2000) Wrestling with Your Conscience: A Guide for Jewish Draft Registrants and Conscientious Objectors. Nyack, NY: Jewish Peace Fellowship.
 Polner, Murray and Stefan Merken (2007) Peace, Justice & Jews: Reclaiming Our Tradition Bunim & Bannigan. 
 Solomonow, Allan (1981) Roots of Jewish Nonviolence. Nyack, NY: Jewish Peace Fellowship
 Polner, Murray and Naomi Goodman (2002), Nonviolent Activist: The Heart & Mind of Edward Feder
 Shalom: The Jewish Peace Letter (an online monthly newsletter published by JPF)

See also
Civilian Public Service
Peace churches

References

External links
 Jewish Peace Fellowship
 Center on Conscience & War: JPF
 Jewish Peace Fellowship Records (I-189) at the American Jewish Historical Society at the Center for Jewish History

Peace organizations based in the United States
Jewish organizations
Jewish organizations established in 1941
Judaism and peace
Organizations based in New York (state)